Y.3173 is an ITU-T Recommendation building upon Y.3172 specifying a  framework for evaluation intelligence levels of future networks such as 5G (IMT-2020). This includes:

 Development trend of network intelligence
 Methods for evaluating network intelligence levels
 Architectural view for evaluating network intelligence levels

The standard addresses issue in Operation, Administration and Maintenance (OAM) of IMT-2020 networks such as:

 diversified network deployment scenarios are
 diversified terminals, such as in Internet of things (IoT)
 manual decision-making mechanisms
 mechanisms analysing large amounts of network
 network connectivity among UEs

 decoupling of software from the hardware in networks

 transition towards a service-based intelligent network

Network intelligence is defined as:

 Level of application of automation capabilities including those enabled by the integration of artificial intelligence techniques in the network.

References

External links 

 ITU-T Recommendation Y.3173

ITU-T Y Series Recommendations
ITU-T recommendations